Nematopogon schwarziellus is a moth of the Adelidae family. It is found in almost all of Europe, except Portugal, Slovenia, Croatia, Greece and Ukraine.

The wingspan is 14–17 mm. Head orange. Forewings long, light shining greyish-ochreous, indistinctly strigulated with grey ; a grey discal mark beyond middle. Hindwings light grey ; cilia whitish-grey.  

Adults are on wing from April to August.

Females have been observed laying eggs on various herbaceous plants, including Ajuga, Alliaria petiolata, Glechoma hederacea and Urtica species. The larvae feed on dead leaves throughout the winter and all the following year until the following spring. They constructs a case from detritus, within which it lives.

References

External links
 Images representing Nematopogon schwarziellus at Consortium for the Barcode of Life

Moths described in 1839
Adelidae
Moths of Europe
Moths of Asia